The ski area Bruncu Spina is the only ski area in Sardinia. The systems are installed on the slopes of Bruncu Spina (Bruncu Spina, S'Arena, and Separadorgiu) and of Monte Spada. It is located in the Gennargentu massif, in the administrative territory of the municipalities of Fonni, Desulo and Villagrande Strisaili, in province of Nuoro.

Snowfall is frequent during winter and, in exceptional cases, can reach a thickness of more than one metre. The ski area is equipped with a Leitner LH420 snow groomer and a snowmobile.

The facilities of the Bruncu Spina represent the largest winter ski resort of Sardinia. They are located on the slopes of Bruncu Spina and are part of Monte Novu, in the administrative territory of the municipalities of Desulo and Villagrande Strisaili. However, the portion of Villagrande Strisaili in the countryside was granted in perpetual lease to the municipality of Fonni.

References 

Ski areas and resorts in Italy

External links
 Official Bruncu Spina Skipass Site (Italian)